Jack I. Kleinbaum (February 26, 1917 – August 3, 1988) was an American businessman and politician.

Kleinbaum was born in Minneapolis, Minnesota, and attended the Minneapolis vocational high school. During World War II, he worked in the Seattle-Tacoma shipyard. In 1947, he and his family moved to St. Cloud, Minnesota, where he owned and managed Jack's Outlet Stores, Inc. Kleinbaum served on the St. Cloud City Council from 1960 to 1964. In 1964, he ran for mayor of St. Cloud and lost by 43 votes. Kleinbaum served three terms each in the Minnesota House of Representatives as a Democrat from 1967 to 1972 and the Minnesota Senate from 1973 to 1980. Although he was Jewish, an uncommon religion in St. Cloud, he won elections in a city and legislative districts with a large Catholic electorate. He died at St. Cloud Hospital after suffering heart problems and other ailments. Funeral services were held at a Catholic church and he was buried in a Jewish cemetery in Richfield, Minnesota.

Notes

1917 births
1988 deaths
Businesspeople from Minneapolis
Politicians from Minneapolis
Politicians from St. Cloud, Minnesota
Minnesota city council members
Democratic Party members of the Minnesota House of Representatives
Democratic Party Minnesota state senators